Barreh is a village in Bakesh-e Do Rural District, in the Central District of Mamasani County, Fars Province, Iran. As of the 2006 census, its population was 52, in 11 families.

References 

Populated places in Mamasani County